Outarde may refer to:

Places
 Pointe-aux-Outardes, Quebec, a municipality in Quebec on the north shore of the St Lawrence estuary, between the mouths of the Outardes and Manicouagan Rivers
 Chute-aux-Outardes, a village in at the mouth of the Outardes River

Other uses
 Outarde (ship, 1939)
 Outarde somalienne, the French name of a bird otherwise known as the little brown bustard (Eupodotis humilis)

See also
 Rivière aux Outardes (disambiguation)